Sri Ramachandra Medical Centre (SRMC) is a tertiary care multi-specialty university hospital in Chennai, India. It is located in the suburb of Porur. It was founded in 1985 and has 1,800 beds.

Accreditation and collaboration
From March 2009 until June 2012, the Sri Ramachandra Medical Centre was accredited by Joint Commission International and by National Accreditation Board for Hospitals & Healthcare Providers (NABH). This distinction followed an intensive collaboration with health care improvement experts at Partners Harvard Medical International.

Departments 
The hospital has the following departments:

 Abdominal Organ Transplantation
 Accident & Emergency Medicine
 Anaesthesiology
 Anatomy
 Arthroscopy & Sports Medicine
 Biochemistry
 Biotechnology
 Bioinformatics
 Cardiothoracic surgery
 Cardiology
 Chest & Tuberculosis
 Community Medicine
 Dermatology & Venereology
 Ear Nose Throat
 Endocrinology
 Family Medicine
 Forensic Medicine
 Genetics
 General Medicine
 General Surgery
 Medical Gastroenterology
 Microbiology
 Neonatology
 Nephrology
 Neuro surgery
 Neurology
 Obstetrics & Gynaecology
 Ophthalmology
 Oral & Maxillofacial Surgery
 Orthopaedic surgery
 Otorhinolaryngology (E.N.T) 	
 Paediatric Medicine
 Paediatric Surgery
 Pathology
 Pharmacy
 Physiology
 Plastic & Reconstructive Surgery
 Psychiatry
 Radiology
 Surgical Gastroenterology
 Transfusion Medicine
 Urology
 Vascular Surgery

References

Hospitals in Chennai
Teaching hospitals in India
Hospitals established in 1985
1985 establishments in Tamil Nadu